This is a list of all commanders, deputy commanders, senior enlisted leaders, and chiefs of staff of the United States Space Command.

Current combatant command staff

Headquarters staff 
  James H. Dickinson, Commander
 U.S. Marine Corps MGySgt Scott H. Stalker, Senior Enlisted Leader
  John E. Shaw, Deputy Commander
  Will Pennington, Chief of Staff
  David L. Stanfield, Director, Human Capital (J1)
  Brian Sidari, Director, Intelligence (J2)
  David N. Miller, Director, Operations, Training, and Force Development (J3/7)
  Richard Zellmann, Deputy Director, Operations (J3)
  Michael T. Morrissey, Director, Plans and Policy (J5)
  Traci Kueker-Murphy, Deputy Director, Strategy, Plans, and Policy (J5)
 British Army Brig Paul Tedman, Deputy Director, Policy and Strategic Partnerships (J5)
   Richard Yu, Director, Command, Control Communications, Computers, and Cyber (J6)
  John A. Watkins, Deputy Director, Command, Control Communications, Computers, and Cyber (J6)
 U.S. Army CSM Thinh T. Huynh, Commandant
  Robert Claude, Mobilization Assistant to the Commander
  Ryan Okahara, Mobilization Assistant to the Commander for National Guard Matters
  David Franklin, Inspector General
  Travis C. Yelton, Chaplain

Component commands staff

Combined Joint Task Force–Space Operations 
  Thomas L. James, Acting Commander
  Brook J. Leonard, Deputy Commander and Director, Operations (J3)

Combined Force Space Component Command 
  Douglas Schiess, Commander
  Zachary S. Warakomski, Deputy Commander
  Phillip A. Verroco, Director, Combined Space Operations Center

Joint Task Force-Space Defense 
  Dennis O. Bythewood, Commander
 Vacant, Deputy Commander
  Stephen G. Lyon, Director, National Space Defense Center

List of commanders of the United States Space Command

 

Commanders of Space Command by branches of service
 Air Force: 8
 Space Force: 1
 Army: 1
 Marine Corps: none
 Navy: none
 Coast Guard: none

List of deputy commanders of the United States Space Command

List of senior enlisted leaders of the United States Space Command

List of chiefs of staff of the United States Space Command

Notes

See also
 United States Space Command
 Leadership of the United States Africa Command
 Leadership of the United States European Command
 Leadership of the United States Indo-Pacific Command
 Leadership of the United States Northern Command
 Leadership of the United States Cyber Command
 Leadership of the United States Strategic Command
 Leadership of the United States Transportation Command

References

Lists of American military personnel